Peter Smith Washington (June 25, 1903 – September 4, 1962), nicknamed "Lefty", was an American Negro league outfielder in the 1920s and 1930s.

A native of Albany, Georgia, Washington made his Negro leagues debut in 1923 for the Washington Potomacs. He went on to enjoy a long career with the Baltimore Black Sox, Philadelphia Stars, New York Black Yankees, and finishing with the Brooklyn Royal Giants in 1936. Washington died in Philadelphia, Pennsylvania in 1962 at age 59.

References

External links
 and Baseball-Reference Black Baseball stats and Seamheads

1903 births
1962 deaths
Baltimore Black Sox players
Brooklyn Royal Giants players
New York Black Yankees players
Philadelphia Stars players
Washington Potomacs players
Wilmington Potomacs players
Baseball outfielders
20th-century African-American sportspeople